Bridgetown railway station or Bridgetown halt (Irish: Baile an Droichid) served the village of Bridgetown, County Wexford, Ireland. It was unstaffed and accessible only via a picket gate.

History
The station opened on 1 August 1906 and closed on 18 September 2010. The rail service was replaced by a revised Bus Éireann route 370 from Monday 20 September 2010: Wexford Bus operate a shuttle bus service to Wexford and Kilmore Quay three times a day (two on Wednesday and no Sunday service). A fourth service between Kilmore Quay and the town in each direction avoids the village. Infrequent Bus Éireann route  381  (Blackhall-Wexford:) and  383  (Kilmore Quay-Wexford:) also serve Bridgetown.

In recent years the platform has become a location for anti-social behaviour and littering. The line is also used as a footpath. However, Iarnród Éireann still maintain the route to an operational standard with several inspection cars plus a similar number of road/rail maintenance moves along the track each year. There's also an annual weedspray train usually hauled by an 071 diesel engine.

Routes

See also 
 List of railway stations in Ireland

References

External links 
Iarnród Éireann webpage from 2007 for Bridgetown station

Iarnród Éireann stations in County Wexford
Disused railway stations in County Wexford
Railway stations opened in 1906
1906 establishments in Ireland
Railway stations in the Republic of Ireland opened in the 20th century